The FIVB world ranking system (until 2020) is a calculation technique previously used by Fédération Internationale de Volleyball (FIVB) for ranking men's and women's national teams in football. The ranking system was introduced by FIVB until 31 January 2020 as using for seeding teams participating 2020 Summer Olympics in Tokyo, Japan before an update to an earlier system, and was replaced during the 2020 FIVB Volleyball Nations League with a revised Elo-based system.

The system is still used in FIVB World Junior and Youth Rankings.

Calculation method
The system of point attribution for the selected FIVB World and Official Competitions below is as follows:
Olympic Games final and qualifying tournaments: included for 4 years and points are also granted for the qualification matches, to the best non-qualified teams.
World Championship final and qualifying tournaments: included for 4 years and points are also granted for the qualification matches, to the best non-qualified teams.
World Cup: included for 4 years 
World Grand Prix: included for 1 year
World League: included for 1 year

Points for final qualifiers

Points for teams eliminated

Men's World Championship

Women's World Championship

Olympic Games

Examples
These are example how world ranking works.

Notes and references

 

World Rankings
Volleyball-related lists
Sports world rankings